is a Japanese Magic: The Gathering player best known for winning the 2006 World Championship, 2011 Team World Championship and being inducted into the 2014 Hall of Fame. Mihara's resume includes four more Pro Tour top eights, and eight Grand Prix top eights, including two wins.

Career 
Mihara's Pro Tour career began at Pro Tour Venice in 2003. Over the three years that followed, he played a number of Pro Tours, but without much success; his best finish being a 53rd place at Pro Tour Kobe. Mihara first came to prominence at the end of the 2005 season, with a Grand Prix top eight in Kitakyuushuu, a top eight that featured seven other players who had all made the top eight of a Pro Tour before. The following season, Mihara managed to establish himself on the Pro Tour, playing all five events and designing the CAL, one of the major decks in extended. Mihara's breakout performance came at that year's World Championship in Paris. After three days of competition, Mihara was in seventh place, and in the quarterfinals of a Pro Tour for the first time. In the quarterfinal, Mihara played Paulo Vitor Damo da Rosa, and almost lost the match to misplays, but managed to draw the exact sequence of cards he needed to win. Mihara's semifinal opponent, Gabriel Nassif, was considered to be a heavy favourite in the match, but Mihara managed the upset in five games. In the final, he played Ryo Ogura. Mihara handily defeated his countryman without losing a single game. The following season, work commitments meant Mihara could not play as many events, but he made the most of the ones he did attend. After a sixteenth-place finish in Geneva, Mihara returned to the top eight at Pro Tour Valencia. Mihara was unable to duplicate his success from the World Championship, and lost in the quarterfinals to Giulio Barra by three games to zero. Mihara rounded out his season with an eighteenth-place finish at the World Championship, to finish the season on 32 pro points. After an unimpressive 152nd-place finish in Kuala Lumpur, Mihara made his third Pro Tour top eight at Pro Tour Hollywood 2008. Like in Valencia the previous year, Mihara's tournament ended in the quarterfinals, losing to Jan Ruess in five games. Although unable to impress on tour, his best finish being a 113th place, Mihara did manage a strong finish off Tour, winning Grand Prix Okayama. The 2009 season was somewhat of an off year for Mihara. While he did not put up any top eights on the Pro Tour or Grand Prix level, he did earn enough points to remain qualified. His only top eight since then was a 2nd-place finish at Grand Prix Sendai 2010, losing to Brian Kibler in the finals. Later that season, Mihara finished third at Japanese nationals earning a spot on the Japanese national team, alongside Ryuuichirou Ishida and Tamoya Fujimoto. At worlds, the Japanese team won the team competition, making Mihara only the fourth player to win both individual and team world titles.

Achievements

References

Year of birth missing (living people)
Living people
Japanese Magic: The Gathering players
People from Chiba (city)
Players who have won the Magic: The Gathering World Championship